Stand Back:  The Anthology is a compilation album by the Allman Brothers Band, released in 2004.  It is the only  retrospective which is cross-licensed among the different record labels for all of the band's studio recordings from its debut in 1969 through 2003.

Track listing

Disc One
"Don't Want You No More" (Spencer Davis, Edward Hardin) – 2:25
"It's Not My Cross To Bear" (Gregg Allman) – 4:57
"Trouble No More" (McKinley Morganfield aka Muddy Waters) – 3:48
"Dreams" (Gregg Allman) – 7:20
"Whipping Post" (Gregg Allman) – 5:22
"Revival" (Dickey Betts) – 4:06
"Midnight Rider" (Gregg Allman, Robert Payne) – 2:59
"Hoochie Coochie Man" (Willie Dixon) – 4:57
"Statesboro Blues" (Live) (Blind Willie McTell) – 4:18
"In Memory of Elizabeth Reed" (Live) (Dickey Betts) – 13:06
"One Way Out" (Live) (Elmore James, Marshall Sehorn, Sonny Boy Williamson II) – 5:00
"Ain't Wastin' Time No More" (Gregg Allman) – 4:34
"Melissa" (Gregg Allman, Steve Alaimo) - 3:56
"Stand Back" (Gregg Allman, Berry Oakley) - 3:27
"Blue Sky" (Dickey Betts) - 5:12
"Little Martha" (Duane Allman) - 2:07

Disc Two
"Wasted Words" (Gregg Allman) – 4:20
"Ramblin' Man" (Dickey Betts) – 4:48
"Come and Go Blues" (Gregg Allman) – 4:56
"Southbound" (Dickey Betts) – 5:09
"Jessica" (Single version) (Dickey Betts) – 4:12
"Can't Lose What You Never Had" (McKinley Morganfield aka Muddy Waters) - 5:51
"Win, Lose or Draw" (Gregg Allman) – 4:46
"Crazy Love" (Dickey Betts) – 3:46
"Just Ain't Easy" (Gregg Allman) – 6:08
"Hell and High Water" (Dickey Betts) – 3:37
"Never Knew How Much (I Needed You)" (Gregg Allman) – 4:29
"Good Clean Fun" (Gregg Allman, Dickey Betts, Johnny Neel) – 5:11
"Seven Turns" (Dickey Betts) - 5:08
"End of the Line" (Gregg Allman, Warren Haynes, Allen Woody, John Jaworowicz) - 4:41
"No One to Run With" (Dickey Betts, John Prestia) - 6:02
"High Cost of Low Living" (Edit) (Gregg Allman, Warren Haynes, Jeff Anders, Ronnie Burgin) - 4:49

Disc 1, Tracks 1-5 from The Allman Brothers Band (1969)
Disc 1, Tracks 6-8 from Idlewild South (1970)
Disc 1, Tracks 9-10 from At Fillmore East (1971)
Disc 1, Tracks 11-16 from Eat a Peach (1972)
Disc 2, Tracks 1-5 from Brothers and Sisters (1973)
Disc 2, Tracks 6-7 from Win, Lose or Draw (1975)
Disc 2, Tracks 8-9 from Enlightened Rogues (1979)
Disc 2, Track 10 from Reach for the Sky (1980)
Disc 2, Track 11 from Brothers of the Road (1981)
Disc 2, Tracks 12-13 from Seven Turns (1990)
Disc 2, Track 14 from Shades of Two Worlds (1991)
Disc 2, Track 15 from Where It All Begins (1994)
Disc 2, Track 16 (Full Version) from Hittin' the Note (2003)

Live Songs
Disc 1, Tracks 9-10 recorded during the 1st Show on 3/13/1971 at the Fillmore East in New York, NY
Disc 1, Track 11 recorded 6/27/1971 at the Fillmore East in New York, NY

Personnel 

Gregg Allman - keyboards, guitar, lead and background vocals
Duane Allman - guitar
Dickey Betts - guitar, lead and background vocals
Berry Oakley -  bass, lead and background vocals
Butch Trucks - drums, percussion
Jai Johanny Johanson - drums, percussion
Chuck Leavell - keyboards, background vocals
Lamar Williams - bass
Dan Toler - guitar
David Goldflies - bass
Bonnie Bramlett - background vocals
David Toler - drums, percussion
Mike Lawler - keyboards
Warren Haynes - guitar, background vocals
Allen Woody - bass, background vocals
Johnny Neel - keyboards, background vocals
Marc Quiñones - percussion
Derek Trucks - guitar
Oteil Burbridge - bass

References

2004 greatest hits albums
The Allman Brothers Band compilation albums